San Solomon Springs is a collection of artesian springs located near the small towns of Toyahvale and Balmorhea in Reeves County, Texas. Between 20 million and 28 million US gallons (90,850 cubic meters) of water a day flow from the springs, supplying water for a  swimming hole before flowing through a reconstructed marsh, all located within Balmorhea State Park. The springs line the sandy bottom of the central portion of the swimming hole, about  beneath the water's surface. The pool is home to several species of fish and turtles, including the Texas spiny softshell turtle.

References

External links

TexasEscapes.com - information on the town
Texas Parks and Wildlife Department - information on the state park

Springs of Texas
Bodies of water of Reeves County, Texas